The 2015 Boston College Eagles baseball team represented Boston College during the 2015 NCAA Division I baseball season. The Eagles played their home games at Eddie Pellagrini Diamond at John Shea Field as a member of the Atlantic Coast Conference. They were led by head coach Mike Gambino, in his fifth year at Boston College.

Previous season
In 2014, the Eagles finished the season 6th in the ACC's Atlantic Division with a record of 22–33, 10–20 in conference play. They failed to qualify for the 2014 Atlantic Coast Conference baseball tournament or the 2014 NCAA Division I baseball tournament.

Personnel

Roster

Coaching staff

Schedule

! style="background:#660000;color:white;"| Regular Season
|- valign="top" 

|- bgcolor="#ffbbbb"
| 1 || February 13 || vs.  ||   || Harley Park • Spartanburg, SC || L 8–4|| Milburn (1–0)|| Skogsbergh (0–1)|| Stillman (1) || 367 || 0–1 || 0–0 ||
|- align="center" bgcolor=""
| 2 || February 14 || vs.  ||  || Harley Park • Spartanburg, SC ||  ||  ||  ||  ||  || ||
|- align="center" bgcolor=""
| 3 || February 14 || at  ||  || Harley Park • Spartanburg, SC ||  ||  ||  ||  ||  ||  ||
|- align="center" bgcolor=""
| 4 || February 15 || vs. Xavier ||  || Harley Park • Spartanburg, SC ||  ||  ||  ||  ||  ||  ||
|- align="center" bgcolor=""
| 5 || February 20 || at LSU ||  || Alex Box Stadium • Baton Rouge, LA ||  ||  ||  ||  ||  ||  ||
|- align="center" bgcolor=""
| 6 || February 21 || at LSU ||  || Alex Box Stadium • Baton Rouge, LA ||  ||  ||  ||  ||  ||  ||
|- align="center" bgcolor=""
| 7 || February 22 || at LSU ||  || Alex Box Stadium • Baton Rouge, LA ||  ||  ||  ||  ||  ||  ||
|- align="center" bgcolor=""
| 8 || February 27 || vs.  ||  || North Charlotte Regional Park • Port Charlotte, FL ||  ||  ||  ||  ||  ||  ||
|- align="center" bgcolor=""
| 9 || February 28 || vs.  ||  || North Charlotte Regional Park • Port Charlotte, FL ||  ||  ||  ||  ||  ||  ||
|-

|- align="center" bgcolor=""
| 10 || March 1 || vs. Kansas ||  || North Charlotte Regional Park • Port Charlotte, FL ||  ||  ||  ||  ||  ||  ||
|- align="center" bgcolor=""
| 11 || March 2 || vs.  ||  || North Charlotte Regional Park • Port Charlotte, FL ||  ||  ||  ||  ||  ||  ||
|- align="center" bgcolor=""
| 12 || March 6 || at Florida State ||  || Dick Howser Stadium • Tallahassee, FL ||  ||  ||  ||  ||  ||  ||
|- align="center" bgcolor=""
| 13 || March 7 || at Florida State ||  || Dick Howser Stadium • Tallahassee, FL ||  ||  ||  ||  ||  ||  ||
|- align="center" bgcolor=""
| 14 || March 8 || at Florida State ||  || Dick Howser Stadium • Tallahassee, FL  ||  ||  ||  ||  ||  ||  ||
|- align="center" bgcolor=""
| 15 || March 13 || at Louisville ||  || Jim Patterson Stadium • Louisville, KY ||  ||  ||  ||  ||  ||  ||
|- align="center" bgcolor=""
| 16 || March 14 || at Louisville ||  || Jim Patterson Stadium • Louisville, KY ||  ||  ||  ||  ||  ||  ||
|- align="center" bgcolor=""
| 17 || March 15 || at Louisville ||  || Jim Patterson Stadium • Louisville, KY ||  ||  ||  ||  ||  ||  ||
|- align="center" bgcolor=""
| 18 || March 17 || at  ||  || Fitton Field • Worcester, MA ||  ||  ||  ||  ||  ||  ||
|- align="center" bgcolor=""
| 19 || March 18 ||  ||  || Pellagrini Diamond • Chestnut Hill, MA ||  ||  ||  ||  ||  ||  ||
|- align="center" bgcolor=""
| 20 || March 20 || NC State ||  || Pellagrini Diamond • Chestnut Hill, MA ||  ||  ||  ||  ||  ||  ||
|- align="center" bgcolor=""
| 21 || March 21 || NC State ||  || Pellagrini Diamond • Chestnut Hill, MA ||  ||  ||  ||  ||  ||  ||
|- align="center" bgcolor=""
| 22 || March 22 || NC State ||  || Pellagrini Diamond • Chestnut Hill, MA ||  ||  ||  ||  ||  ||  ||
|- align="center" bgcolor=""
| 23 || March 24 || at  ||  || Parsons Field • Brookline, MA ||  ||  ||  ||  ||  ||  ||
|- align="center" bgcolor=""
| 24 || March 27 || Duke ||  || Pellagrini Diamond • Chestnut Hill, MA ||  ||  ||  ||  ||  ||  ||
|- align="center" bgcolor=""
| 25 || March 28 || Duke ||  || Pellagrini Diamond • Chestnut Hill, MA ||  ||  ||  ||  ||  ||  ||
|- align="center" bgcolor=""
| 26 || March 29 || Duke ||  || Pellagrini Diamond • Chestnut Hill, MA ||  ||  ||  ||  ||  ||  ||
|- align="center" bgcolor=""
| 27 || March 31 || at Connecticut ||  || J. O. Christian Field • Storrs, CT ||  ||  ||  ||  ||  ||  ||
|-

|- align="center" bgcolor=""
| 28 || April 1 ||  ||  || Pellagrini Diamond • Chestnut Hill, MA ||  ||  ||  ||  ||  ||  ||
|- align="center" bgcolor=""
| 29 || April 3 || at Wake Forest ||  || Wake Forest Baseball Park • Winston-Salem, NC ||  ||  ||  ||  ||  ||  ||
|- align="center" bgcolor=""
| 30 || April 4 || at Wake Forest ||  || Wake Forest Baseball Park • Winston-Salem, NC ||  ||  ||  ||  ||  ||  ||
|- align="center" bgcolor=""
| 31 || April 5 || at Wake Forest ||  || Wake Forest Baseball Park • Winston-Salem, NC ||  ||  ||  ||  ||  ||  ||
|- align="center" bgcolor=""
| 32 || April 7 || at  ||  || Biondi Park • Hanover, NH ||  ||  ||  ||  ||  ||  ||
|- align="center" bgcolor=""
| 33 || April 8 || Northeastern ||  || Pellagrini Diamond • Chestnut Hill, MA ||  ||  ||  ||  ||  ||  ||
|- align="center" bgcolor=""
| 34 || April 10 || Clemson ||  || Pellagrini Diamond • Chestnut Hill, MA ||  ||  ||  ||  ||  ||  ||
|- align="center" bgcolor=""
| 35 || April 11 || Clemson ||  || Pellagrini Diamond • Chestnut Hill, MA ||  ||  ||  ||  ||  ||  ||
|- align="center" bgcolor=""
| 36 || April 12 || Clemson ||  || Pellagrini Diamond • Chestnut Hill, MA ||  ||  ||  ||  ||  ||  ||
|- align="center" bgcolor=""
| 37 || April 14 ||  ||  || Pellagrini Diamond • Chestnut Hill, MA ||  ||  ||  ||  ||  ||  ||
|- align="center" bgcolor=""
| 38 || April 15 ||  ||  || Pellagrini Diamond • Chestnut Hill, MA ||  ||  ||  ||  ||  ||  ||
|- align="center" bgcolor=""
| 39 || April 17 || Georgia Tech ||  || Pellagrini Diamond • Chestnut Hill, MA ||  ||  ||  ||  ||  ||  ||
|- align="center" bgcolor=""
| 40 || April 18 || Georgia Tech ||  || Pellagrini Diamond • Chestnut Hill, MA ||  ||  ||  ||  ||  ||  ||
|- align="center" bgcolor=""
| 41 || April 19 || Georgia Tech ||  || Pellagrini Diamond • Chestnut Hill, MA ||  ||  ||  ||  ||  ||  ||
|- align="center" bgcolor=""
| 42 || April 22 || TBD ||  || Fenway Park • Boston, MA ||  ||  ||  ||  ||  ||  ||
|- align="center" bgcolor=""
| 43 || April 24 || at  ||  || Boshamer Stadium • Chapel Hill, NC ||  ||  ||  ||  ||  ||  ||
|- align="center" bgcolor=""
| 44 || April 25 || at North Carolina ||  || Boshamer Stadium • Chapel Hill, NC ||  ||  ||  ||  ||  ||  ||
|- align="center" bgcolor=""
| 45 || April 26 || at North Carolina ||  || Boshamer Stadium • Chapel Hill, NC ||  ||  ||  ||  ||  ||  ||
|- align="center" bgcolor=""
| 46 || April 28 || at Rhode Island ||  || Bill Beck Field • Kingston, RI ||  ||  ||  ||  ||  ||  ||
|-

|- align="center" bgcolor=""
| 47 || May 1 || at Virginia Tech ||  || English Field • Blacksburg, VA ||  ||  ||  ||  ||  ||  ||
|- align="center" bgcolor=""
| 48 || May 2 || at Virginia Tech ||  || English Field • Blacksburg, VA ||  ||  ||  ||  ||  ||  ||
|- align="center" bgcolor=""
| 49 || May 3 || at Virginia Tech ||  || English Field • Blacksburg, VA ||  ||  ||  ||  ||  ||  ||
|- align="center" bgcolor=""
| 50 || May 9 || Hartford ||  || Pellagrini Diamond • Chestnut Hill, MA ||  ||  ||  ||  ||  ||  ||
|- align="center" bgcolor=""
| 51 || May 10 || Hartford ||  || Pellagrini Diamond • Chestnut Hill, MA ||  ||  ||  ||  ||  ||  ||
|- align="center" bgcolor=""
| 52 || May 12 ||  ||  || Pellagrini Diamond • Chestnut Hill, MA ||  ||  ||  ||  ||  ||  ||
|- align="center" bgcolor=""
| 53 || May 14 || Notre Dame ||  || Pellagrini Diamond • Chestnut Hill, MA ||  ||  ||  ||  ||  ||  ||
|- align="center" bgcolor=""
| 54 || May 15 || Notre Dame ||  || Pellagrini Diamond • Chestnut Hill, MA ||  ||  ||  ||  ||  ||  ||
|- align="center" bgcolor=""
| 55 || May 16 || Notre Dame ||  || Pellagrini Diamond • Chestnut Hill, MA ||  ||  ||  ||  ||  ||  ||
|-

|-
| style="font-size:88%" | All rankings from Collegiate Baseball.

Awards and honors
Chris Shaw
 Louisville Slugger Pre-season Second Team All-American
 Perfect Game USA Pre-season First team All-American
 Baseball America Pre-season Second team All-American

References

Boston College Eagles
Boston College Eagles baseball seasons
Boston College Eagles baseball
Boston College Eagles baseball